The 1999 Generali Ladies Linz was a tennis tournament played on indoor hard courts in Linz, Austria. It was part of Tier II of the 1999 WTA Tour. The tournament was held from October 25 through October 31, 1999.

Entrants

Seeds

Other entrants
The following players received wildcards into the singles main draw:
  Barbara Schwartz
  Patricia Wartusch

The following players received wildcards into the doubles main draw:
  Sylvia Plischke /  Patricia Wartusch

The following players received entry from the singles qualifying draw:

  Barbara Rittner
  Sandra Kleinová
  Amanda Hopmans
  Denisa Chládková

The following players received entry as lucky losers:
  Cara Black

The following players received entry from the doubles qualifying draw:
  Amanda Hopmans /  Silvija Talaja

Finals

Singles

 Mary Pierce defeated  Sandrine Testud, 7–6(7–2), 6–1
 This was Pierce's thirteenth WTA title of her career.

Doubles

 Irina Spîrlea /  Caroline Vis defeated  Tina Križan /  Larisa Neiland, 6–4, 6–3

External links
 ITF tournament edition details

Generali Ladies Linz
Linz Open
Generali Ladies Linz
Generali Ladies Linz
Generali